The 2018–19 Kennesaw State Owls women's basketball team represents Kennesaw State University during the 2018–19 NCAA Division I women's basketball season. The Owls, led by third year head coach Agnus Berenato, play their home games at the KSU Convocation Center and were members of the Atlantic Sun Conference. They finished the season 9–22, 4–12 in A-Sun play to finish in seventh place. They advanced to the semifinals of the A-Sun Tournament where they lost to Florida Gulf Coast.

Roster

Schedule

|-
!colspan=9 style=| Exhibition

|-
!colspan=9 style=| Non-conference regular season

|-
!colspan=9 style=| Atlantic Sun Conference season

|-
!colspan=9 style=| Atlantic Sun Women's Tournament

Rankings
2018–19 NCAA Division I women's basketball rankings

See also
 2018–19 Kennesaw State Owls men's basketball team

References

Kennesaw State
Kennesaw State Owls women's basketball seasons